Lamprista is a genus of moths in the family Lecithoceridae.

Species
 Lamprista emmeli Park & Lee, 2013
 Lamprista ortholepida Park & Lee, 2013

References

Lecithoceridae